The following is a list of linear integrated circuits.  Many were among the first analog integrated circuits commercially produced; some were groundbreaking innovations, and many are still being used.

See also
 List of LM-series integrated circuits

References

Electronic design
Electronics lists